A bed of nails is an oblong piece of wood, the size of a bed, with nails pointing upwards out of it. It appears to the spectator that anyone lying on this "bed" would be injured by the nails, but this is not so. Assuming the nails are numerous enough, the weight is distributed among them so that the pressure exerted by each nail is not enough to puncture the person's skin.

Uses

One use of such a device is for magic tricks or physics demonstrations. For example, the bed of nails was used in vaudeville in the United States, as well as in sideshows of circuses and carnivals. A famous example requires a volunteer to lie on a bed of several thousand nails, with a board on top of him. Cinder blocks are placed on the board and then smashed with a sledgehammer. Despite the seemingly unavoidable force, the volunteer is not harmed: the force from the blow is spread among the thousands of nails, resulting in reduced pressure; the breaking of the blocks also dissipates much of the energy from the hammer. This demonstration of the principles of weight distribution requires that the weight of the volunteer be spread over as many nails as possible. The most dangerous part is the moment of lying down or getting up, when one's weight may briefly be supported on only a few nails. Some "beds" have rails mounted at the sides to help users lie down and get up safely.

The bed of nails is used by some for meditation, particularly in Asia, and for certain alleged health benefits, such as back pain relief, through acupressure.

Less traditional settings, such as science centers, may use an electronic retractable bed of nails, where the user lies on a flat plastic bed with holes in it, and can then activate the machine to have nails rise up all at once. The nails should retract before getting off the bed. This retraction eliminates the most dangerous part of a traditional bed of nails, getting on and off the bed.

Guinness World Records
Most motorcycles driven over the body while lying on a bed of nails achieved by Burnaby Q. Orbax of the Monsters of Schlock on 26 October 2015 when he had 70 motorbikes driven over him in two minutes while lying on a bed of nails.

Heaviest concrete block break on a bed of nails achieved by Neal Hardy (Australia) on 12 February 2012 when he had 15 blocks weighing 774.99 kg (1708 lb 8 oz) placed on his chest and broken.

The most melons chopped in half on somebody's stomach (with a samurai sword while they lay on a bed of nails) achieved by Johnny Strange (UK) on 13 October 2013 when he chopped 10 watermelons in half on the stomach of his assistant in 30 seconds.

Most-layered bed of nails sandwich achieved by Vispi and his Team (all India) on 23 October 2019 when they performed a nine-layer bed of nails sandwich.

References

External links
 The bed of nails in use as a school physics demonstration. Darylscience.com

Sideshow attractions
Asceticism
Nail (fastener)